A portage railway is a short and possibly isolated section of railway used to bypass a section of unnavigable river or between two water bodies which are not directly connected.
Cargo from waterborne vessels is unloaded, loaded onto conventional railroad rolling stock, carried to the other end of the railway, where it is unloaded and loaded onto a second waterborne vessel.
A portage railway is the opposite of a train ferry.

Examples 

The following are or were locations of portage railways:

Australia 
 Victor Harbor to Goolwa – originally horse drawn – mouth of Murray River often silted up or was useless due to low water levels.
 the first railway in Queensland started at the inland river port of Ipswich rather than the capital of Brisbane to save money.  Twenty years later, the line was extended to Brisbane.
 several rail lines terminated at river ports, such as Robertson, Echuca, Bourke, Morgan, Brewarrina

Brazil 
 Madeira-Mamoré Railroad (365 km; 227 mi) along the huge rapids of upper Madeira

Canada 

 Carillon and Grenville Railway
 Champlain and St. Lawrence Railroad
 Chignecto Ship Railway
 Huntsville and Lake of Bays Transportation Company
 Nosbonsing & Nipissing Railway
 White Pass and Yukon Route

Central African Republic 
 Zinga to Mongo

China
 The Three Gorges Portage Railways, on each side of the Yangtze River in the Three Gorges Dam area (see Three Gorges Dam#Portage railways). Preliminary work on this project started in 2012.

Congo-Brazzaville 
 Congo-Ocean Railway

Congo-Kinshasa 
 Matadi–Kinshasa Railway
 Ubundu to Kisangani, see Great lakes line first section

England 
 Cromford and High Peak Railway connected Cromford Canal to the Peak Forest Canal

Greece 
 Diolkos near Corinth Canal

Laos 
 Don Det – Don Khon narrow gauge railway

Panama 
 Panama Railway

Russia 
 Krasnoyarsk hydroelectric dam ship elevator

United States
 Allegheny Portage Railroad
 Morris Canal
 New Castle and Frenchtown Turnpike and Rail Road
 Tuscumbia, Courtland and Decatur Railroad

Czechia 
 Narrow gauge line on Kamýk Dam used for transport of canoes and flatboats over the dam.

References

Portages
Railways by type